Oliver Parker (born 2 June 1969) is an English director, producer and screenwriter. He wrote and directed the 2018 musical film Mamma Mia! Here We Go Again.

Early life
Parker was born in London, England, and brought up in the village of Radwinter, near the market town of Saffron Walden in Essex.

Parker was educated at Dame Bradbury's School, an independent school in Saffron Walden in Essex, and at Clare College at the University of Cambridge, where he read English.

Career
Parker's directing credits include Imagine Me & You (2005) and Now Is Good (2012). He wrote the screenplay for Imagine Me & You, The Best Exotic Marigold Hotel (2011) and The Second Best Exotic Marigold Hotel (2015), and wrote and directed the musical sequel, Mamma Mia! Here We Go Again (2018). He wrote and directed the 2022 romantic comedy Ticket to Paradise, starring George Clooney and Julia Roberts.

Personal life 
He married actress Thandiwe Newton in 1998, and they have three children: daughters Ripley (b. 2000) and Nico (b. 2004), and son Booker Jombe (b. 2014). 

He and Thandiwe Newton separated in 2022.

Filmography

References

External links
 

1969 births
Living people
British male screenwriters
Writers from London
Writers from Essex
Film directors from London
Alumni of Clare College, Cambridge